Mihai Lungan (born 29 September 1978) is a Romanian former professional footballer who played as a defender or midfielder. He played in Liga I for Bihor Oradea and Jiul Petroșani and made his debut on 10 August 2003 in a match between Bihor Oradea and Rapid București.

References

External links
 

1978 births
Living people
Sportspeople from Râmnicu Vâlcea
Romanian footballers
Association football defenders
Association football midfielders
Liga I players
Liga II players
FC Drobeta-Turnu Severin players
FC Bihor Oradea players
CSM Jiul Petroșani players
SCM Râmnicu Vâlcea players
CS Concordia Chiajna players
Romanian expatriate footballers
Romanian expatriate sportspeople in England
Expatriate footballers in England